Per Bertil Norström (9 September 1923 – 6 September 2012) was a Swedish actor. Born in Sala, he was married to the actress Margreth Weivers from 1947 until his death.

Selected filmography
1956 - The Staffan Stolle Story
1967 - I Am Curious (Yellow)
1970 - A Swedish Love Story
1970 - Skräcken har 1000 ögon
1972 - Nya hyss av Emil i Lönneberga
1972 - Ture Sventon
1973 - Pistol
1977 - Bröderna Lejonhjärta
1978 - Hedebyborna (TV)
1980 - Sverige åt svenskarna
1981 - Göta kanal eller Vem drog ur proppen?
1981 - Rasmus på luffen
1983/1984 - TV-piraterna
1984 - Panik i butiken (TV)
1987 - Varuhuset (TV)
1988 - Kråsnålen (TV)
1991 - Den ofrivillige golfaren
1992 - The Emperor of Portugallia
1995 - Sjukan (TV)
2007 - Hjälp! (TV)
2011 - Tjuvarnas jul (TV)

References

External links

https://web.archive.org/web/20140917193222/http://www.sfi.se/sv/svensk-filmdatabas/Item/?type=PERSON&itemid=66831

Swedish male stage actors
Swedish male film actors
Litteris et Artibus recipients
1923 births
2012 deaths
20th-century Swedish male actors